Der Feldarbeiter ('The Farm Worker') was a newspaper published from Budapest, Hungary from 1906 to 1907. The first issue was published on 21 April 1906. It was a German-language edition of Világszabadság. Initially edited by Kálmán Jócsák, from 30 June 1906 onwards it was edited by Richard Schwarz. It was replaced by Weltfreiheit.

References

1906 establishments in Hungary
1907 disestablishments in Europe
Defunct newspapers published in Hungary
German-language newspapers published in Hungary
Newspapers published in Budapest
Publications established in 1906
Publications disestablished in 1907
Socialist newspapers